Choratan is a village in the Berd Municipality of the Tavush Province of Armenia.

History 
In 1854, settlers from Choratan founded the village of Artsvashen.

References

External links 

Populated places in Tavush Province